Anna Cabot Quincy Waterston (Quincy; pen names, A. C. Q. W. and W. A. C. Q.; June 27, 1812 – October 14, 1899) was a 19th-century American writer of poems, novels, hymns, and a diary.

Early life and family
Anna Cabot Lowell Quincy was born June 27, 1812 in Boston, Massachusetts. She was the youngest daughter of Josiah Quincy III, who served as president of Harvard University, U.S. Representative, and Mayor of Boston. Her mother was Eliza Susan Morton Quincy. Anna's grandfather, Josiah Quincy II, had also served as mayor of Boston, as did her brother, Josiah. Her other siblings were: Eliza, Abigail, Maria, Margaret, and Edmund.

On April 21, 1840, she married Rev. Robert C. Waterston (1812–93). After passing two years in Europe, and, just as they were all about to return home, their daughter, Helen Ruthven Waterston (1841 - July 25, 1858), died at Naples, Italy.

Career
Some of Waterston's verses were printed in 1863, in a small volume. She also published articles in The Atlantic Monthly. Her pen names included, "A. C. Q. W.", and "W. A. C. Q.".

In 1870, after visiting Jeanne Carr, Waterston left Oakland, California for Yosemite. Waterston was able to gather around her a wide circle of friends and acquaintances. She knew well and was intimately associated with many of the most distinguished people of the former generation. When her father entertained Lafayette, she was a school girl, but the occasions made such an impression upon her mind that she retained a vivid remembrance of it in later years. The cause of the blind was important to her ever since the establishment of the Perkins Institution and Massachusetts School for the Blind.

Death and legacy

Waterston died October 14, 1899, at her home, No. 526 Massachusetts Avenue, in Newton, Massachusetts, where she lived since 1860, and was buried at Mount Auburn Cemetery. Her carved marble bust was sculpted by Edmonia Lewis and is held by the Smithsonian American Art Museum. In 2003, her diary, written at the age of seventeen, was posthumously published under the title A Woman's Wit and Whimsy.

Selected works
 Quincy
 Sketchbook, ca. 1835
 Together, 1863
 Verses, 1863
 Edmonia Lewis. (The young colored woman who has successfully modelled the bust of Colonel Shaw.)., 1865
 Adelaide Phillipps: A Record. Boston: A. Williams and Company, 1883.

Posthumously published
 A Woman's Wit & Whimsy: The 1833 Diary of Anna Cabot Lowell Quincy, edited by Beverly Wilson Palmer. Boston: Northeastern University Press, 2003.

See also

 Quincy political family

References

Attribution

Bibliography
 
 
 
 Beverly Wilson Palmer (ed.), A Woman's Wit & Whimsy: The 1833 Diary of Anna Cabot Lowell Quincy, Boston : Northeastern University Press, 2003.

External links
 

1812 births
1899 deaths
19th-century American novelists
19th-century American poets
19th-century American women writers
American women poets
Poets from Massachusetts
American hymnwriters
Writers from Boston
Quincy family
Pseudonymous women writers
American diarists
American women novelists
American women non-fiction writers
19th-century American non-fiction writers
Burials at Mount Auburn Cemetery
19th-century pseudonymous writers
19th-century diarists